YouTestMe is a software development company with headquarters in Toronto, Canada. The company specializes in e-learning, with features like test management, remote proctoring, item authoring, and reporting. The GetCertified knowledge-examination platform is the flagship product of YouTestMe used in various government agencies and corporations.

History 
The initial idea was conceived in 2006. However, the necessary technology to begin development was not yet available, so it took five years to establish the foundation and create the technologies needed to develop future e-learning systems. The development process finally began in late 2011, based on Java programming and the Linux operating system.

The initial concept for YouTestMe revolved around the testing process, including test-taking, test creation, and distribution, as well as sending reports to test takers and managers via email. After three years of development, the first stable system, YouTestMe Starter, was released in 2014.

Later development, based upon YouTestMe Starter, brought forth several products and projects - both mobile and web-based.

Timeline 

 2006 - The concept of YouTestMe as e-learning software was established.
 2011 - Development on the first YouTestMe version begins.
 2014 - The first stable version of YouTestMe - Starter is released.
 2015 - First YouTestMe - Starter installation on the "John Naisbitt" University.
 2015 - YouTestMe - Starter promotion is held in Belgrade. YouTestMe - Classroom 2020 development begins.
 2016 - YouTestMe - Classroom 2020 development finishes,
 2016 - "Entrance exam" application for Serbian Elementary school 8th graders is published.
 2016 - "Canadian Citizenship" application for practicing exams for becoming a citizen of Canada is published
 2020 - "YouTestMe Nastava", a free application for students and teachers is published.

Products

Software

YouTestMe - GetCertified 
YouTestMe GetCertified is a testing software that offers features for knowledge evaluation and certification. The software offers various test creation methods and settings, allowing users to customize tests according to their preferences. YouTestMe GetCertified also includes cheating prevention mechanisms.

Mobile TakeQuiz 

The first mobile YouTestMe application - Entrance Exam (original Serbian translation: "Prijemni za srednju") is designed for students in the 8th grade of Serbian Elementary Schools - more precisely, those that are about to transition into High School. The application is limited to the Android platform exclusively since it is the most dominant platform in Serbia. The application was designed with the purpose to enable all students in Serbia to practice Entrance Exam questions on their Android devices. The questions are extracted from the official workbooks issued by the Government of Serbia.

References 

Organizations based in Toronto